Christopher Ryan "Chris" Fountain (born 3 September 1987) is an English actor and DJ. He is known for his roles as Damien Jones in Emmerdale, Justin Burton in Hollyoaks and as Tommy Duckworth in  Coronation Street.

Early life 

Fountain was born in the West Yorkshire city of Bradford on 3 September 1987.

Career
Fountain first came to prominence in 2003, when he joined the Channel 4 soap series Hollyoaks, in the role of Justin Burton. In 2008 Fountain won the British Soap Award for Best Actor due to his role on Hollyoaks. It was confirmed on 11 March 2009 that Fountain would be leaving Hollyoaks. He left on 3 June 2009 in a joint exit storyline alongside Jamie Lomas who plays Warren Fox.

In February 2006, Fountain came in third in the BBC show Just the Two of Us, a singing competition in which celebrities are paired up with professional singers and are voted off, day by day. His singing partner was former S Club 7 member Jo O'Meara.

Fountain was a runner up in the third series of ITV show Dancing on Ice, in which he was partnered with skater Frankie Poultney. He also won the Dancing on Ice Tour 2008 with 24 wins and went home with the Dancing on Ice Tour Winners Trophy for winning the most shows. Second place went to Suzanne Shaw with eleven wins and third place went to Kyran Bracken with nine wins.

In January 2010, Fountain appeared as a patient called Seb in Casualty. Fountain played the role of PC Paul Tait in the BBC drama Five Days in March 2010.

In November 2010, it was announced that Fountain would play the role of Tommy Duckworth in Coronation Street and made his first on-screen appearance in March 2011. Fountain made his final appearance on 13 October 2013, with his character having an off-screen exit on 23 October 2013. 

In September 2016, he joined the touring cast of The Full Monty.

Fountain played the title role in the pantomime Aladdin at the Manchester Opera House over the Christmas/New Year period of 2009/2010. In 2010 he appeared in the new musical Departure Lounge for a short run at the Waterloo East Theatre in London.

Fountain appeared on All Star Family Fortunes on 14 April 2012. In December 2012, he took part in ITV game show Paddy's 2012 Show and Telly.

In 2018, Fountain featured in Kay Mellor's drama series Girlfriends as Ryan.

Personal life
Fountain was sacked from Coronation Street following a video of him rapping about rape under an alter ego called "The Phantom". The video having been recorded years before. Fountain apologised for the incident.

In June 2006, Fountain injured himself on location whilst filming for Hollyoaks when he touched an electric fence.

In October 2022, Fountain revealed in a social media post that he had suffered a transient ischemic attack in that August, for which he was undergoing treatment at the Royal London Hospital.

Filmography

Awards and nominations
2005
 Nominated at British Soap Awards in category of 'Best Dramatic Performance from a Young Actor or Actress' for his role in Hollyoaks

2006
 Winner at British Soap Awards in category of 'Best Storyline' for 'Justin and Becca's affair' in Hollyoaks, shared with Ali Bastian (Becca Dean)
 Winner at The Pulse West Yorkshire Local Heroes Awards as Artistic Achievement of the Year
 Nominated at British Soap Awards in category of 'Sexiest Male' for his role in Hollyoaks
 Nominated at National Television Awards in category of 'Most Popular Actor' for his role in Hollyoaks

2007
 Nominated at British Soap Awards in category of 'Best Actor' for his role in Hollyoaks
 Nominated at British Soap Awards in category of 'Sexiest Actor' for his role in Hollyoaks

2008
 Winner at British Soap Awards in category of 'Best Actor' for his role in Hollyoaks
 Winner at British Soap Awards in category of 'Most Spectacular Scene of the Year' for 'Car Over Cliff', shared with Hannah Tointon (Katy Fox), Jamie Lomas (Warren Fox), Matt Littler (Max Cunningham) and Gemma Bissix (Clare Cunningham).
 Nominated at British Soap Awards in category for 'Most Spectacular Scene of the Year' for 'Justin Run Over', shared with Hannah Tointon (Katy Fox)

2012
 Nominated at National Television Awards for 'Best Newcomer' for his role in Coronation Street
 Nominated at British Soap Awards for 'Sexiest Male', but lost out to Scott Maslen, who plays Jack Branning in the soap EastEnders.
In July 2012, Fountain made the shortlist for Best Actor on the TV choice awards. He was also up for Sexiest Male for the Inside Soap Awards.

References

External links

 

1987 births
Living people
English male soap opera actors
Male actors from Bradford